Season thirty-two of the television program American Experience aired on the PBS network in the United States on January 6, 2020 and concluded on July 7, 2020. The season contained eight new episodes and began with the film McCarthy.

Episodes

References

2020 American television seasons
American Experience